Inés Moreno (1932 – 20 December 2020) was an Argentine film and television actress who often played vampish roles. Moreno was married to the actor Juan Carlos Barbieri with whom she had a daughter Andrea Barbieri who is also an actress. She later divorced Barbieri and married the Uruguayan journalist Lucho Avilés.

Selected filmography
 Behind a Long Wall (1958)

References

Bibliography 
 Vega, Hugo F.  Televisión Argentina: 1951-1975: La Información. Ediciones del Jilguero, 2001.

External links 
 

1932 births
Argentine film actresses
Argentine television actresses
2020 deaths